Cape Sibbald is a cliffed cape at the southwest margin of Lady Newnes Bay on the coast of Victoria Land. It marks the southwest extremity of the Mountaineer Range at the terminus of Aviator Glacier. Sighted in February 1841 by Sir James Clark Ross and named by him for Lieutenant (later Cdr.) John Sibbald of the Erebus.

Headlands of Victoria Land
Borchgrevink Coast